The 1868 United States presidential election in Wisconsin was held on November 3, 1868 as part of the 1868 United States presidential election. State voters chose eight electors to the Electoral College, who voted for president and vice president.

Wisconsin was won by Republican Party candidate Ulysses S. Grant, over Democratic candidate, Horatio Seymour. Grant won the state with 56.25 percent of the popular vote, winning the states eight electoral votes.

Results

See also
 United States presidential elections in Wisconsin

References

Wisconsin
1868 Wisconsin elections
1868